

Systems

Tropical Cyclone Kim

Tropical Cyclone Laurie

Tropical Cyclone Marion

Severe Tropical Cyclone June

Unnamed Tropical Cyclone

Unnamed Tropical Cyclone

Tropical Cyclone Norman

Tropical Cyclone Pat

Severe Tropical Cyclone Robert

Season effects

|-
| Kim ||  || bgcolor=#| || bgcolor=#| || bgcolor=#| || || || ||
|-
| Laurie ||  || bgcolor=#| || bgcolor=#| || bgcolor=#| || || || ||
|-
| Marion ||  || bgcolor=#| || bgcolor=#| || bgcolor=#| || Vanuatu || Unknown ||  ||
|-
| June ||  || bgcolor=#| || bgcolor=#| || bgcolor=#| || || || ||
|-
| Unnamed ||  || bgcolor=#| || bgcolor=#| || bgcolor=#| ||  || || ||
|-
| Unnamed ||  || bgcolor=#| || bgcolor=#| || bgcolor=#| ||  || || ||
|-
| Norman ||  || bgcolor=#| || bgcolor=#| || bgcolor=#| || || || ||
|-
| Pat ||  || bgcolor=#| || bgcolor=#| || bgcolor=#| || || || ||
|-
| Robert ||  || bgcolor=#| || bgcolor=#| || bgcolor=#| || || || ||
|-

See also

Atlantic hurricane seasons: 1976, 1977
Eastern Pacific hurricane seasons: 1976, 1977
Western Pacific typhoon seasons: 1976, 1977
North Indian Ocean cyclone seasons: 1976, 1977

References

External links

 
South Pacific cyclone seasons
Articles which contain graphical timelines